St. Gabriel's Episcopal Church is an historic Episcopal Church church located in Douglassville, Pennsylvania. The church is a part of the Diocese of Bethlehem.

History 
St. Gabriel's was founded in 1720 as a Swedish Lutheran church. In 1760 the church joined the Church of England. The oldest structure is known as Saint Gabriel's 1801 Chapel.   It was built in 1801, and is a two-story, three bay by two bay, brownstone building.  It features a herringbone design in the stone construction. The interior was restored in 1959. It was listed on the National Register of Historic Places in 1978.

The larger structure was consecrated in 1884. An addition was made in 1959 that contains administrative offices and classrooms. The interior of the 1884 church was remodeled in 2003. In 2005, the existing 1959 portion of the building was remodeled and expanded to include more classrooms and a large parish hall.

The historic cemetery has veterans from most wars, starting with the Revolutionary War (25 veterans) and ending with the Persian Gulf War (1 veteran).  The one exception is the Spanish-American War.

List of Clergy

 Andreas Rudman, 1701-1707
 Andrew Sandel, 1708-1719
 Samuel Hesselius, 1720-1723
 Assistant Pastors of Wicaco, 1723-1734
 Gabriel Falck, 1735-1745
 Henry M. Muhlenberg, 1748-1752
 John Abraham Lidenius, 1752-1755
 Henry M. Muhlenberg, 1755-1761
 Alexander Murray, 1762–1778, 1790-1793
(During the Revolutionary War period. Reverend Murray returned to England. The Parish was cut off from the Church of England so there were no stated public ministrations.)
 John Wade, 1795-1797
 Caleb Hopkins, 1798-1801
 John Armstrong, 1801-1805
 Caleb Hopkins, 1805-1806
 Levi Bull, 1806-1825
 Caleb J. Good, 1826-1827
 George Mintzer, 1828-1836
 William Homman, 1837-1838
 Henry F. M. Whitesides, 1839
 Oliver A. Shaw, 1840
 George Burker, 1840-1842
 Edmund Leaf, 1844-1868
 Jeremiah Karcher, 1869-1871
 Edmund Leaf, 1872-1876
 John Long, 1877-1886
 Edward J. Koons, 1886-1888
 William DuHamel, 1889-1892
 Samuel McElwee, 1892-1906
 William R. Holloway, 1907-1912
 A. S. H. Winsor, 1912-1914
 William DuHamel, 1915-1928
 Arthur B. Vossler, 1928-1934
 Daniel C. Osborne, 1935-1938
 Irving Angell McGrew, 1939-1942
 Thomas B. Smythe, 1943-1959
 Woodworth B. Allen, Jr., 1959-1962
 Lloyd I. Wolf, 1962-1965
 Kenneth T. Cosbey, 1966-1987
 Calvin C. Adams, 1987-2010
 David Green, 2013-2018
 Andrew D. VanBuren, 2019–present

References

External links
St. Gabriel's Official Website

Historic American Buildings Survey in Pennsylvania
Churches on the National Register of Historic Places in Pennsylvania
Churches completed in 1801
19th-century Episcopal church buildings
Churches in Berks County, Pennsylvania
St. Gabriel
National Register of Historic Places in Berks County, Pennsylvania
Swedish-American history
Swedish-American culture in Pennsylvania
New Sweden
Churches in New Sweden